Bala station is a SEPTA Regional Rail station in Bala Cynwyd, Pennsylvania. Located near the intersection of Bala Avenue and City Avenue (US 1), it serves the Cynwyd Line. The station includes a 76-space parking lot at the northwest corner of the City Avenue bridge over the railroad tracks.

Station layout

References

External links
SEPTA – Bala Station
 City Avenue entrance from Google Maps Street View

SEPTA Regional Rail stations
Former Pennsylvania Railroad stations
Lower Merion Township, Pennsylvania
Railway stations in Montgomery County, Pennsylvania